Lullaby is a 1959 Soviet drama film directed by Mikhail Kalik.

Plot 
The film tells about the pilot Losev, who is sent to look for his daughter, which survived the bombing.

Cast 
 Nikolai Timofeyev as Losev
 Viktoriya Lepko as Aurika
 Lida Pigurenko as Aurika as a Little Girl
 Lyubov Rumyantseva as Aurika, the Archivist's Daughter (as Lyubov Chernoval)
 Vitaly Chetverikov as Pavel
 Yury Solovyov as Sgt. Mikheyev
 Shura Kuznetsov as Niku
 Mark Troyanovsky as The Archivist
 Svetlana Svetlichnaya

References

External links 
 

1959 films
1950s Russian-language films
Soviet drama films
1959 drama films